Llangovan is a small village in Monmouthshire, south east Wales, United Kingdom.

History and amenities 
Llangovan is close to Monmouth, the county town and is set in a quiet, rural area of rolling hills beneath the Trellech ridge. The Church of St Govan is a Grade II* Listed Building. It is now closed and  has a colony of bats. The churchyard contains an ornate medieval stone cross which is a Grade II listed building.

At Llanwinney is the remains of a chapel which bears the inscription "Bethel Chapel Erected in 1841".

Nearby Court St. Lawrence, once home of Sir Geoffrey David Inkin, the High Sheriff of Gwent, is also a Grade II listed building.

In 2007 Penyclawdd and Llangovan Village Hall was completely refurbished.

Notable people
Sawnder Sion, 16th century poet

References

External links

 Genuki on Llangovan
 Parish census record from 1851

Villages in Monmouthshire